The 2011 Ogun State gubernatorial election was the 7th gubernatorial election of Ogun State. Held on April 26, 2011, the Action Congress of Nigeria nominee Ibikunle Amosun won the election, defeating Tunji Olurin of the People's Democratic Party.

Results 
A total of 19 candidates contested in the election. Ibikunle Amosun from the Action Congress of Nigeria won the election, defeating Tunji Olurin from the People's Democratic Party. Valid votes was 729,671, votes cast was 764,384, 34,713 votes was cancelled.

References 

Ogun State gubernatorial elections
Ogun gubernatorial
April 2011 events in Nigeria